This is a '''list of ultramarathons.

Road, dirt path, and track ultramarathons

Mountain and trail ultramarathons

Extreme-condition ultramarathons

Very long and multi-day ultramarathons

References

ultramarathons